Nash Rawiller (born 8 December 1974) is a prominent Australian jockey, based in Sydney. He has ridden races in many other parts of the world, including France, Great Britain, Hong Kong, Italy, New Zealand, Singapore and United Arab Emirates. He began his career in Victoria but moved to Sydney in 2007 to link up with prominent trainer Gai Waterhouse. Waterhouse has described Rawiller as "a brilliant rider".

Rawiller has won many significant races including 66 Group One wins, one of which was the lucrative 2005 Dubai Duty Free valued at $1.3 million, but his biggest win to date is riding Elvstroem to victory in the 2004 Caulfield Cup.

He has ridden in Australia's richest horse race, the Melbourne Cup on several occasions.

As at 31 December 2013, Rawiller has ridden in 7540 races and been placed in 2044 races including 1481 wins. Total prize money for horses ridden by Rawiller is over $87 million. He is a three-time winner of the Sydney jockeys title.

Personal life
Rawiller is married to Sarah and has two children Caitlin and Campbell. He is from a 'racing family'; his brother, Brad and sister Stacey are also jockeys and his brother, Todd is a trainer. Campbell started his riding career as an apprentice in 2019 and has already ridden more than 100 winners. He is now apprenticed to Gai Waterhouse at Randwick.  Their father, Keith, was a jumps jockey, and their mother, Elaine, is a nurse.

References

External links
 Nash Rawiller official statistics

1974 births
Living people
Jockeys from Melbourne